Clive Bush is a British writer and emeritus professor of American literature at King's College, London, where he was head of its English department. He is the author of several books relating to 19th and 20th century American history, arts and philosophy, and has produced five poetry books.

Selected publications

References

External links

British academics
Living people
Alumni of King's College London
Academics of King's College London
English literature academics
British poets
Year of birth missing (living people)